Roshen Confectionery Corporation is a Ukrainian confectionery manufacturing group. It operates facilities in the Ukrainian cities of Kyiv, Vinnytsia, Ivankiv and Kremenchuk, as well as in Budapest, Hungary and Klaipėda, Lithuania. The name of the company was derived from the last name of its owner Petro Poroshenko (Poroshenko), who also was the president of Ukraine between 2014 and 2019. 

In 2012, the Roshen Corporation was ranked 18th in the "Candy Industry Top 100" list of the world's largest confectionery companies. It has a total annual production volume of 410,000 tonnes. It exports to Kazakhstan, Uzbekistan, Kyrgyzstan, Azerbaijan, Georgia, Armenia, Moldova, Estonia, Hungary, Poland, Latvia, Lithuania, the United States, Canada, Germany, Romania, Finland, Bulgaria and Israel. It exported to Russia, with 40 percent of the company's grosses came from there until Russia stopped importing from the company in July 2013. In early 2017 Candy Industry put ROSHEN on 24th place in "2017 Global Top 100" of confectionery producers and estimated its annual revenue at $800 million.

Owners and management 
Participating in the 2014 presidential election in Ukraine, Petro Poroshenko announced his intention to sell Roshen after the victory, in the avoidance of any conflicts of interest. At a press conference on June 5, 2015 in Kyiv, Petro Poroshenko assured that he intends to transfer his stake in the confectionery corporation "Roshen" to the management of a private investment banking company N M Rothschild & Sons, owned by the Rothschild family. In January 2016, he announced the signing of an agreement on the transfer of these shares.

History

Ban of exports to the Russian Federation
In July 2013, Russia banned all Roshen imports due to dissatisfaction with the packaging labelling. Soon after Roshen products were also checked in Kazakhstan, Belarus, Kyrgyzstan and Moldova but this did not lead to complaints. On 21 October 2013, Russia's ambassador to Ukraine Mikhail Zurabov said, "There are no problems with the quality of products, they are safe. But there are problems associated with the production technology, using some ingredients that are not certified in accordance with the law." According to the 17 December 2013 Ukrainian-Russian action plan by 1 March 2014 Roshen products should have been back in Russian stores. But on 12 March 2014, acting head of the Russian Federal Service for Supervision of Consumer Rights Protection and Human Welfare Anna Popova stated that Ukraine had not yet fulfilled their requirements to return Roshen products to the Russian market.

Late March 2014 the Roshen factory in Lipetsk (Russia) was closed down and its local manager director charged with "conspiring with unnamed others to use a registered trademark illegally to extract additional profits". Ukraine and the factory workers suspected the factory was closed because of Roshen's owner Petro Poroshenko involvement in Euromaidan and his participation in the 2014 Ukrainian presidential election. According to Reuters some of the Roshen factory workers in Lipetsk felt embarrassed to work for Ukrainians "swept up in a wave of Russian patriotism since Moscow annexed Crimea" and gossiped about rumours of how the management "paid Ukrainians more money and were cheating the Russians". On 13 May 2014 Russia banned the sale of Roshen products in Crimea. In April 2017 full production stopped in the Lipetsk factory; leaving 700 people jobless.

As noted, the seizure of property of the Lipetsk confectionery factory, imposed by the Investigative Committee of the Russian Federation under a criminal case, made it impossible to sell the factory.

During the election campaign of the 2014 Ukrainian presidential election Roshen owner Poroshenko pledged to sell all his shares in Roshen if elected President; Poroshenko was elected President but by late December 2014 was not able to find a buyer for the company. Because of this in January 2016 Poroshenko transferred his share of the corporation to an independent blind trust. The Bank Ruling Trust has a four-year-old proxy to negotiate the sale of assets.

Production network changes
Roshen closed down its confectionery factory in Mariupol (Ukraine) in 2015 after the Donbass war in the vicinity and an export ban by Russia made production there unviable.

The corporation was earlier reported to operate facility in the town of Bershad (Ukraine), but it's not listed on the corporate web site.

Since March 2012, Roshen began co-production with a contract manufacturer in Hungary named "Bonbonetti."

Products and brands
"ROSHEN" is the umbrella brand of all of the corporation's products. The name is a truncated version of Poroshenko, the last name of its owner. ROSHEN produces more than 350 kinds of confectionery products. The product line includes chocolate and jelly sweets, caramel, toffee, chocolate bars, biscuits, wafers, sponge rolls, pastry and cakes. The total volume of production reaches around 300,000 tonnes per year. They are most well known for their "Kyiv Vechirniy" chocolate candy and Kyiv cakes, produced by the flagship Kyiv Roshen Factory in Kyiv. The corporation has a wide range of more affordable and less sophisticated products famous for high chocolate content. In 2013, the company manufactured about 200 types of confectionery products and in total produced 410,000 tonnes of products that year.

References

External links

Official website

Ukrainian chocolate companies
Confectionery companies of Ukraine
Manufacturing companies based in Kyiv
Ukrainian brands
Petro Poroshenko
Buildings and structures in Vinnytsia
Ukrainian companies established in 1996